The discography of Alison Moyet, an English pop singer-songwriter, consists of nine studio albums, three compilation albums, two live releases, thirty singles and a number of appearances with other artists.

Albums

Studio albums

Compilation albums

Live albums

EPs

Singles

Promotional singles

Videography

Other appearances
"The Coventry Carol" (from A Very Special Christmas, Vol. I), 1987.
"My Best Day" (album track from Jollification by the Lightning Seeds), co-writer and vocals, 1994.
"Make A Change" (album track from Nearly God by Tricky), co-writer and vocals, 1996.
"What A Wonderful World" (Comic Relief CD single/cassingle only extra track, from When the Going Gets Tough by Boyzone), vocals, 1999.
"Waiting" (by My Robot Friend), vocals, 2010.
"Walking Down Madison" and "Head" (Live at Shepherd's Bush Empire, from 'A Concert For Kirsty MacColl'), 2013.

See also
List of songs recorded by Alison Moyet

References

Discographies of British artists
Pop music discographies